The California Rancheria Termination Acts refer to three acts of Congress and an amendment passed in the 1950s and 1960s as part of the US Indian termination policy. The three Acts, passed in 1956, 1957, and 1958 targeted 41 Rancherias for termination. An additional seven were added via an amendment in 1964.  Including three previous terminations, 46 of the 51 targeted Rancherias were successfully terminated.  Through litigation and legislation, over 30 Rancherias have been restored and at least five are still working to be.

Terminations prior to 1958 

The first termination occurred on 29 March 1956 for the Koi Nation of the Lower Lake Rancheria in two laws, Public Law 443 [H. R. 585] 70 Stat. 58 and Public Law 751 [H. R. 11163] 70 Stat. 595 which amended the description of the property. Lake County purchased the Lower Lake Rancheria property to build an airport and the tribal position was that though they were landless, they had not been officially terminated. Indian Health program records, however, show that the tribe was officially terminated as of 29 March 1956 and no tribal members were eligible for services. After years of attempting to have their status reaffirmed, the Bureau of Indian Affairs "citing oversights in official records,” recognized the tribe on 29 December 2000.

The second termination occurred on 10 July 1957 when the Coyote Valley Band of Pomo Indians was displaced with passage of Public Law 85-91  71 Stat. 283 authorizing the sale of the Coyote Valley Rancheria by the Secretary of the Interior to the Secretary of the Army for the Russian River Basin project to build the Coyote Valley Dam. Though this band was relocated a few miles away to the Coyote Valley Reservation, records of the Indian Health program show that it was terminated and all tribal members were ineligible for further services as of 10 July 1957. Like the Koi Nation, this may have been a recording error, as the tribe is a federally recognized entity.

One final Rancheria appears to have been terminated prior to the 1958 Act. According to the Indian Health program records, Laguna Rancheria was terminated effective 4 February 1958.

California Rancheria Termination Act of 1958 

On 18 August 1958, Congress passed the California Rancheria Termination Act, Public Law 85-671. The act called for the distribution of all 41 rancheria communal lands and assets to individual tribe members. It called for a plan "for distributing to individual Indians the assets of the reservation or Rancheria, including the assigned and the unassigned lands, or for selling such assets and distributing the proceeds of sale, or conveying such assets to a corporation or other legal entity organized or designed by the group, or for conveying such assets to the group, as tenants in common."
Before the land could be distributed, the act called for a government survey of land on the rancheria. The government was required to improve or construct all roads serving the rancheria, to install or rehabilitate irrigation, sanitation, and domestic water systems, and to exchange land held in trust for the rancheria. All Indians who received a portion of the assets were ineligible to receive any more federal services rendered to them based on their status as Indians.

In 1957–58, a State Senate Interim Committee investigation revealed that little had been done to prepare Indian reserves for termination. In 1958, the Rancheria Termination Act was enacted. A memo from the Department of Interior shows the insufficiency of the notice given the California Indians, which was simply posted on the Rancheria for 30 days. In many testimonies, like that of the Nisenan of the Nevada City Rancheria, plaintiffs alleged that BIA officials spoke only to whoever was occupying the homestead at the time, rather than consulting with Indians living in the surrounding area.

1964 Amendment 

In 1964, an amendment to the California Rancheria Termination Act was enacted, terminating additional rancheria lands. Overall, then, there were 3 rancherias terminated prior to Public Law 85-671, 41 mentioned in Public Law 85-671, an additional 7 included in the amendment of 1964 and 5 that were never terminated but were listed, correcting the number of California Rancherias terminated from the oft-cited 41 to 46 total terminations.  The Bureau of Indian Affairs states that while 41 Rancherias were slated for termination ultimately only 38 were terminated under the Rancheria Act, the source of this discrepancy is unknown.

Restoration 

Many tribes expressed dissatisfaction with termination immediately. Federal failures to live up to promised improvements and educational opportunities that were supposed to be part of an agreement to accept termination led eventually to lawsuits calling to reverse terminations.

The first successful challenge was for the Robinson Rancheria which was 22 March 1977 and it was followed by 5 others: the Hopland Rancheria was restored 29 March 1978; The Upper Lake Rancheria was restored 15 May 1979; the Table Bluff Rancheria was restored 21 September 1981; the Big Sandy Rancheria was restored 28 March 1983; and the Table Mountain Rancheria was restored in June, 1983. Each of these decisions only pertained to one reservation.

The success of these suits and frustration with unmet promises, caused Tillie Hardwick in 1979 to consult with California Indian Legal Services, who decided to make a class action case. On 19 July 1983 a U.S.District Court in Tillie Hardwick, et al. v. United States of America, et al. Case #C-79-1710-SW ordered federal recognition of 17 of California's Rancherias. The Hardwick decision restored more terminated tribes than any other single case in California and prompted the majority of the terminated Rancherias to pursue federal restoration.

Of the 46 terminated Rancherias 27 have been restored, one (Coyote Valley) didn't need restoration because it is currently recognized, and at least five Rancherias are still trying to restore their federal status.

Lists of California Rancherias 

The ACCIP Termination Report: The Continuing Destructive Effects of the Termination Policy on California Indians, (ACCIP Termination Report) prepared by the Advisory Council on California Indian Policy in September, 1997 lists 7 additional reservations which were terminated as a result of the 1964 Amendments to the Rancheria Act, which did not list them by name.

See also
Aboriginal title in California
California Indian Reservations and Cessions
Western Oregon Indian Termination Act

References 

United States federal Indian policy
Assimilation of indigenous peoples of North America
Aboriginal title in the United States
History of California
Indigenous peoples of California
Native American history of California
Native American tribes in California